The 1968 Friuli-Venezia Giulia regional election took place on 26 May 1968. The legislature was expanded to five years following the creation of the ordinary regions.

Events
Christian Democracy was by far the largest party, largely ahead of the Italian Communist Party which came second. After the election Alfredo Berzanti, the incumbent Christian Democratic President, formed a government with the Italian Socialist Party and the Republicans (organic Centre-left).

Results
Sources: Istituto Cattaneo and Cjargne Online

References

Elections in Friuli-Venezia Giulia
1968 elections in Italy